Divisional Extra was the third division of the Asociación Uruguaya de Fútbol in 1913 until 1930 and the fourth division of Uruguayan football (soccer) in 1942 until 1978.

Divisional Extra

Third Division Champions
Tournament names:
 1913–1931: Divisional Tercera Extra 
 1936–1941: Divisional Extra

Fourth Division Champions
 1942–1947: Divisional Extra
 1948–1971: Divisional Extra A
 1972–1978: Primera D

Divisional de Ascenso a la Extra
The Divisional Extra "B" and "C" were suppressed. The teams that were disputing these championships were grouped from 1968 on in the Divisional de Ascenso a la Extra.

Fifth Division Champions
Tournament names:
 1968–1971: División de Ascenso

Divisional Extra B

Fifth Division Champions
Tournament names:
 1948–1966: Divisional Extra B

Notes

A. At the end of the 1953 season, San Lorenzo Unión was directly promoted to Divisional Extra A.
B. At the end of the 1954 season, the 3 best-placed teams were directly promoted to Divisional Extra A. These teams were Boston River, Maroñas and Misterio.
C. At the end of the 1956 season, the 2 best-placed teams were directly promoted to Divisional Extra A. These teams were El Puente and San Borja.
D. At the end of the 1962 season, the 2 best-placed teams were directly promoted to Divisional Extra A. These teams were Huracán and La Picada.
E. At the end of the 1963 season, the 3 best-placed teams were directly promoted to Divisional Extra A. These teams were Florencia, Lucero and Misterio.
F. At the end of the 1965 season, the 6 best-placed teams were directly promoted to Divisional Extra A. These teams were El Puente, Félix Olmedo, Lavalleja, Porvenir, Samuel Benedetti and Unión Vecinal.

Divisional Extra C

Sixth Division Champions
Tournament names:
 1966: Divisional Extra C

See also 
 Uruguayan football league system
 Uruguayan Primera División
 Uruguayan Segunda División
 Uruguayan Primera División Amateur

References

External links 
Official Webpage

Football leagues in Uruguay
Fourth level football leagues of South America
Sports leagues established in 1913
1913 establishments in Uruguay